Charles Ware (1933 – 24 November 2013) was an Irish hurler who played as a right wing-forward for the Waterford senior team.

Born in Waterford, Ware first played competitive hurling during his schooldays at De La Salle College. He arrived on the inter-county scene at the age of twenty-one when he made his senior debut in the 1954-55 National Hurling League. Ware went on to play for Waterford for much of the next decade, and won one All-Ireland medal as a non-playing substitute and one Munster medals.

At club level Ware won one championship medal with Erin's Own.

His retirement came following Waterford's defeat by Kilkenny in the 1963 championship.

Ware's father, Charlie, and his uncle, Jim, also enjoyed lengthy hurling careers with Waterford.

Honours

Team

Erin's Own
Waterford Senior Hurling Championship (1): 1962

Waterford
All-Ireland Senior Hurling Championship (1): 1959 (sub)
Munster Senior Hurling Championship (2): 1959, 1963 (sub)
National Hurling League (1): 1962-63 (sub)

References

1933 births
2013 deaths
Erin's Own (Waterford) hurlers
Irish printers
Waterford inter-county hurlers